Blanton v. North Las Vegas, 489 U.S. 538 (1989), is a United States Supreme Court case clarifying the limitations of the right to trial by jury.

Background
Melvin R. Blanton was charged with driving under the influence of alcohol. His petition for a jury trial was denied and he was instead given a bench trial. Blanton appealed, arguing that his Sixth Amendment right to trial by jury had been violated.

Opinion of the Court
The Court ruled that Blanton did not have the right to a jury trial because the crime he was charged with was "petty" because it carries a maximum prison term of six months or less. The Court went on to elaborate: "we do find it appropriate to presume for purposes of the Sixth Amendment that society views such an offense as 'petty.' A defendant is entitled to a jury trial in such circumstances only if he can demonstrate that any additional statutory penalties, viewed in conjunction with the maximum authorized period of incarceration, are so severe that they clearly reflect a legislative determination that the offense in question is a 'serious' one."

See also
 List of United States Supreme Court cases, volume 489
 List of United States Supreme Court cases
 Lists of United States Supreme Court cases by volume
 List of United States Supreme Court cases by the Rehnquist Court

References

External links
 

United States Supreme Court cases
United States Supreme Court cases of the Rehnquist Court
United States Sixth Amendment jury case law
1989 in United States case law
North Las Vegas, Nevada
Driving under the influence